Cristiana Dumitrache (born 30/09/1998) is a Romanian scientist, head of the Astrophysical Institute at the Astronomical Observatory of the Romanian Academy.

See also 
 Eurasian Astronomical Society

References

External links
 Cristiana Dumitrache, Nedelia Antonia Popescu, Fifty Years of Romanian Astrophysics, ediția a doua, Ed. Cartea Universitară, 2006

Members of the Eurasian Astronomical Society
1956 births
Living people